Glaucoda is a genus of moths of the family Crambidae. It contains only one species, Glaucoda transparitalis, which is found in Cameroon, the Democratic Republic of Congo, Equatorial Guinea, Sierra Leone and Togo.

References

Pyraustinae
Crambidae genera
Monotypic moth genera
Taxa named by Ferdinand Karsch